Milton is a historic home located at Bethesda, Montgomery County, Maryland, United States. Also known as the Loughborough House, the building was constructed in two stages and is built of uncoursed granite. The older section, constructed prior to 1820, is one and one-half stories and a two-story three bay structure was subsequently built in 1847. Outbuildings on the property include a square, stone smokehouse with a square, hipped roof, and a 19th-century stone ice house. It was the home of Nathan Loughborough, Comptroller of the Treasury during the John Adams administration. From 1934 until the 1970s, the house was owned by the agricultural economist, Mordecai J. Ezekiel.

Milton was listed on the National Register of Historic Places in 1975.

References

External links
, including photo in 1974, at Maryland Historical Trust website
Milton, River Road, Somerset vicinity, Montgomery, MD at the Historic American Buildings Survey (HABS)

Houses completed in 1847
Houses in Montgomery County, Maryland
Houses on the National Register of Historic Places in Maryland
Georgian architecture in Maryland
Buildings and structures in Bethesda, Maryland
Historic American Buildings Survey in Maryland
1847 establishments in Maryland
National Register of Historic Places in Montgomery County, Maryland